Jangah (also Romanized as Jangāh and Jongāh) is a village in Qushkhaneh-ye Pain Rural District, Qushkhaneh District, Shirvan County, North Khorasan Province, Iran. At the 2006 census, its population was 238, in 56 families.

References 

Populated places in Shirvan County